Eudrapa is a genus of moths of the family Noctuidae. The genus was erected by Francis Walker in 1858.

Species
Eudrapa basipunctum Walker, 1858
Eudrapa fontainei Berio, 1956
Eudrapa grisea Pinhey, 1968
Eudrapa lepraota Hampson, 1926
Eudrapa maculata Berio, 1956
Eudrapa metathermeola Hampson, 1926
Eudrapa mollis Walker, 1857
Eudrapa olivaria Hampson, 1926
Eudrapa sogai Viette, 1965

References

Calpinae